David Coupland (born 16 March 1986) is an English professional golfer.

Amateur career
In 2010, Coupland won the Tillman Trophy with a record setting score.

In 2011, Coupland lost a playoff for the Australian Amateur Stroke Play Championship and represented England at the 2011 European Amateur Team Championship.

Professional career
In 2018, he won twice and led the Order of Merit on the PGA EuroPro Tour, qualifying for the 2019 Challenge Tour. After finishing 55th in the 2019 Challenge Tour Order of Merit, Coupland qualified for the European Tour by way of Q School.

His 2020 season was limited due to the COVID-19 pandemic, so his playing privileges were extended to the 2021 season.

Professional wins (3)

PGA EuroPro Tour wins (3)

Results in major championships
Results not in chronological order in 2020.

CUT = missed the half-way cut
NT = No tournament due to COVID-19 pandemic

Team appearances
Amateur
European Amateur Team Championship (representing England): 2011

See also
2019 European Tour Qualifying School graduates

References

External links

English male golfers
European Tour golfers
1986 births
Living people